Ufa center is a neighbourhood of Ufa, Bashkortostan. It is bordered by the Belaya River on the south and the Nizhegorodka neighborhood on the west, Tsyurupy Street on the east, Revoljucionnaja Street on the north. It is a residential area, containing the park, the Ufa engine-building production association, the Rezyapov Ufa number 2 thermal power station. More than 70 percent of higher education institutions, cultural institutions and authorities are concentrated in this area. This is a problem for citizens, as a contrast is created: a clean and presentable micro-center and poor suburbs.

Gallery

References

Ufa neighbourhoods